The Moctezuma River (Río Moctezuma) is a river in Mexico that drains the eastern side of the Trans-Mexican Volcanic Belt (Sierra Nevada). It is a tributary of the Pánuco River and flows through the Mexican states of Hidalgo, Querétaro, and San Luis Potosí.

Course 
The Moctezuma arises in the Zimapán Dam, this reservoir is formed by the Tula and San Juan rivers which join in the reservoir to form the Moctezuma River later downstream of the dam.  The Zimapán Dam,is a hydroelectric dam about 15 km southwest of the town of Zimapán. At Tamazunchale it receives the Amajac River. Below the town of Tanquián de Escobedo it forms the border between the states of San Luis Potosí and Veracruz. It receives the Tempoal River at El Higo. It ends at its confluence with the Tamuín River (Tampaón River) where together they form the Pánuco River.

See also

List of rivers of Mexico

Notes and references

Sources
Atlas of Mexico, 1975 (https://www.webcitation.org/689BebJNR?url=http://www.lib.utexas.edu/maps/atlas_mexico/river_basins.jpg).
The Prentice Hall American World Atlas, 1984.
Rand McNally, The New International Atlas, 1993.

Rivers of the State of Mexico
Rivers of Hidalgo (state)
Rivers of Querétaro
Rivers of San Luis Potosí
Rivers of Veracruz
Tributaries of the Pánuco River